Hans Dorn (or Johannes Dorn) was a German printer of the late 15th and early 16th centuries, active in Brunswick. He is known to have been in Brunswick during the period of 1493–1525.

He may have been active as a bookseller before becoming a printer. The first book known to have printed by him, and at the same time the oldest known book printed in Brunswick, is a Low German Plenarium with the title Dath boke der hilgen Ewangelien. Lectien. Profecien unde Epistelen, dated 15 July 1506. An earlier print by Dorn, dated 1502, is mentioned in an 18th-century source. Dorn primarily produced theological or liturgical works in Low German and Latin, such as Summula doctrinarum Jhesu Christi by Nikolaus Decius, St. Annen Büchlein. (1507),  Judenspiegel. by Johannes Pfefferkorn (1507),   by Henning Caldrusius (1511), Distichoneomenion Abaci: sive Computus ecclesiastici ... (1517),  De guldene Lettanye: Dagelicke Anropynge unde Bede tho gode, Marien, und allem hemmelischen Hehre (1518).

From 1518, he also printed Protestant literature, such as Martin Luther's Sermon von Ablass und Gnade (1518)
and Gottschalk Kruse's  (1521).
He also printed two medical worksm, and a travelogue of the pilgrimage from Hildesheim to Santiago de Compostela by Gerd Helmich.
His last known print dates to 1525. The year of his death is unknown. 
He does not appear to have had a direct successor, the next known printer in Brunswik is Andreas Goldbeck, active from 1539.

References 

 Luitgard Camerer, Ulrike Fischer: Der Buchdruck in der Stadt Braunschweig vor 1671. in: Stadtarchiv und Öffentliche Bücherei Braunschweig: Kleine Schriften Nr. 13., ed. Wolf-Dieter Schuegraf, Braunschweig, 1985.
 H. Claus: Hans Dorn: Erstdrucker in Braunschweig. in: Basiliae Rauracorum, Referate eines informellen ostwestlichen Kolloquiums Basel und Augst 15. bis 26. April 1991. .
 Städtisches Museum Braunschweig, 450 Jahre Braunschweiger Druckgewerbe. Westermann Verlag, Braunschweig, 1958.

German printers
Businesspeople from Braunschweig
Mass media in Braunschweig
History of Brunswick
15th-century births
16th-century deaths